Cerautola ceraunia, the silvery epitola, is a butterfly in the family Lycaenidae. It is found in Sierra Leone, Liberia, Ivory Coast, Ghana, Togo, Nigeria (south and the Cross River loop), Cameroon, Gabon, the Republic of the Congo, Angola, the Central African Republic, the Democratic Republic of the Congo, Uganda and north-western Tanzania. Its habitat consists of forests.

Adults have been recorded in February.

The larvae are associated with the ant species Crematogaster buchneri.

References

Butterflies described in 1873
Poritiinae
Butterflies of Africa
Taxa named by William Chapman Hewitson